Kelleys Island is both a village in Erie County, Ohio, and the island which it fully occupies in Lake Erie. The British originally called it Sandusky Island. Later the United States took it over and officially designated it as Island Number 6 and Cunningham Island. It was renamed as Kelleys Island in 1840 by brothers Datus and Irad Kelley, who had purchased nearly the entire island.

History
Kelleys Island was previously occupied by Native Americans of the area. During the beginning of the War of 1812, the island was used as a military rendezvous post, first by the British and later by the U.S. Military. During the early 19th century, the island was mostly uninhabited. After the Kelley brothers purchased the land, there was commercial development through extraction of the island's limestone and lumber resources, and the population began to grow with workers and families. There was also growing of grapes as a commodity crop. As of the 2010 census, the island's population was 312.

Today, Kelleys Island is primarily a vacation destination, and is visited by thousands of people each summer. Notable attractions include its various beaches, parks, and campgrounds. Several ferries provide regular transport to the mainland for most travelers; the island also features a number of marinas, as well as a small airfield for private planes. It is the largest of the American Lake Erie Islands, and is a part of the Sandusky, Ohio Metropolitan Statistical Area.

Native Americans and Inscription Rock
Kelleys Island is a Devonian limestone and dolomite ridge carved during the Pleistocene era. The first known occupants of Kelleys Island were either Erie, Native Americans, who lived in the area until 1656.

On the south shore of the island (near what is now the downtown-village area), there is a large limestone rock featuring petroglyphs carved over a number of years by these and earlier indigenous inhabitants; it was later named 'Inscription Rock' by scholars in the mid-19th century. The Kelleys Island Historical Association  relies on the Henry Rowe Schoolcraft investigations, which dated the carvings to roughly 1643. He theorized that the rock was used by members of "seasonal" Native American tribes, to impart information to one another about how the hunting had been in the area, and where their group would next be traveling.

Many different items and scenes are cut into the large flat top side of the rock, which measures  by 21 feet (10 by 6 m). Over time, most of the inscriptions on this rock have been eroded away. The indigenous peoples who are thought to have inscribed these images, are said to have been annihilated about 1665 by Iroquois nations from the New York area, who were trying to conquer territory to control the fur trade.

Early pioneer settlers
This island is called "Sandusky Island" on maps produced in the latter half of the 18th-century. (Prior to U.S. occupation of this area, the name "Cunningham's Island" seems to have been applied to present-day "Catawba Island", which was then also a true island.) In the late 1790s the Connecticut Land Company surveyed the south east shore of Lake Erie. A more thorough survey was completed in 1806, when this island was officially designated as "Island Number 6". Later the name "Cunningham's Island" was used to refer to this island.

There is a legend that the first European American resident of this island was a man named "Cunningham" (supposedly a "Frenchman" or French-speaking Canadian). He was said to have traveled to the island in 1803 with the intention of making his home there, at a time when it was still inhabited by Native Americans. For a while, Cunningham enjoyed friendly relationship with the native people: he built a log cabin near their village, socialized with their hunters, and traded goods with them on a regular basis. But (as the legend goes) Cunningham had a disagreement with the Native Americans, and a group tore down his home, stole all his possessions, and attempted to kill him. He escaped to the Ohio Peninsula via canoe, but died shortly afterward from his wounds. For many years after his death, the island was known as Cunningham Island. [ However, the legend of Mr. Cunningham might instead apply to present-day Catawba Island, which seems to have been formerly named "Cunningham's Island" by the British, prior to 1804.) (*-Also note that the surname 'Cunningham' is not typically of French origin, but is recorded as of Scottish origin.)] Prior to the War of 1812, several other white adventurers are documented as trying to settle this island, but all of them were eventually being driven away, either by the native people, or by the incoming U.S. pioneers and land-owners. By the time the war had ended, the few remaining Native Americans had finally also vacated the island.

During the War of 1812, the west shore of Cunningham Island was developed as a military rendezvous post by US General William Henry Harrison. In 1818, a man named Killam briefly attempted to start a logging company, but abandoned the island after the large steam-powered boat he used to transport wood to the mainland wrecked and sank. Around 1826, people slowly began settling on the island; by 1830, six families made up its entire population.

About the year 1833, Ben Napier, a French-Canadian veteran of the War of 1812, claimed ownership of this "Cunningham Island" (and also nearby Put-in-Bay), through squatters rights. Napier and his associates often bullied the incoming pioneer settlers, sometimes hijacking their cabins and stealing or killing their livestock. Napier was eventually legally ousted after the court system ruled that he had no ownership rights.

Acquisition by the Kelleys
In 1830, John Clemons and his brother began mining the island's limestone, and opened its first quarry. They built a dock on the north side in order to ship the rock to the American mainland. Shortly afterward, brothers Datus and Irad Kelley became aware of the island's potential worth, and slowly began purchasing its land in parcels.

Datus and Irad Kelley were born in Middlefield, Connecticut, on April 24, 1788, and October 24, 1791, respectively. Datus moved to Rocky River, Ohio, in 1811, working as a surveyor and sawmill owner. Irad moved to Cleveland, Ohio, in 1812, eventually becoming a successful merchant, postmaster, sailor, and real-estate investor. Irad Kelley first became aware of the island after being forced to seek shelter there while transporting goods via sloop sailboat from Detroit to his shop in Cleveland. On August 20, 1833, the two began purchasing parcels of land on Cunningham Island at the rate of $1.50 per acre. They eventually owned the entire  island, and in 1840 changed its name to Kelleys Island. By this time, the population had risen to 68 people.

The brothers quickly began improving and expanding the island's docks to export limestone, fruit, and red cedar lumber. Soon, 16 limestone kilns were producing lime. The village's various industries hired a number of immigrants (including young children), many of whom would work on the island during the summer and return to their homeland during the winter. Among the nationalities working on the island at that time were Irish, Poles, Slavs, Macedonians, Hungarians, Bulgarians, Italians, and Portuguese. Datus Kelley encouraged sobriety, and paid his employees bonuses for abstaining from "intoxifying liquors".

The quarries were the origin of the Kelley Island Lime & Transport Company, which was once the largest producer of limestone and lime products in the world, operating between 1896 and the early 1960s. Numerous ruins of these operations and quarries now dot the island.

In 1842, Charles Carpenter (son-in-law of Datus Kelley) of Norwich, Connecticut, began growing and harvesting grapes for wine on Kelleys Island. By the early 20th century, the island was annually producing 500,000 gallons of wine per year.

The small village grew quickly, and soon a library and post office were erected. In 1901, the Estes Schoolhouse was built at a cost of $15,000.

Recent history and modern day
Kelleys Island is heavily forested except for several residential areas, some for year-round residents, others for summer vacationers. Some small farms and a small limestone quarry still operate on the island. Each summer since 1974 (typically in August), the island hosts a weekend-long homecoming festival, which includes a theme parade featuring both locals and vacationers, a picnic, and a number of food and craft booths.

Kelleys Island has a cemetery located on Division Street, about a mile north from the center of downtown. Although the cemetery is relatively small, several hundred people are buried or have memorial headstones there. Burials include that of Datus Kelley.

In 1975,  on the island's southern shore were designated as a historic district, the Kelleys Island South Shore District, and added to the National Register of Historic Places. In 1988, the district was renamed to the Kelleys Island Historic District and expanded to include the entire island.

On August 19, 2010, three downtown businesses on Division Street were destroyed after a fire started in the attic of the Country Store. The fire quickly spread from the convenience store where it began to neighboring businesses in the complex: Papa T's Ice Cream Shop and Vi's Island Treasures. The vinyl siding of the neighboring Island House restaurant partially melted during the event. The Country Store had closed following the summer of 2009, and was vacant at the time of the fire. An Ohio state fire marshal later ruled the blaze had started from a work lamp that was left on in the vacant grocery shop's attic. The Kelleys Island Volunteer Fire Department of 12 people took approximately 15 minutes to arrive on the scene. 15 to 20 additional firefighters were dispatched from the mainland. No one was injured during the fire, but the entire building had to be razed shortly afterward.

Attractions

Beaches and wildlife
Kelleys Island features a number of public beaches. Many areas allow swimming, boating, and fishing.

In August 2010, a report from The Nature Conservancy in conjunction with the US Fish and Wildlife Service U.S. Fish & Wildlife Service, the Ontario Ministry of Natural Resources, and several other non-profit agencies listed Kelleys as the 7th most ecologically threatened island in the Great Lakes. The reasons given for the island's poor ecological health included "development, tourism and recreation, marinas and resorts, increased roads and buildings, incompatible agricultural practices and invasive species."

Businesses
The most common types of establishments on Kelleys Island are pubs and restaurants, almost all of which have a summer season from May into September. The island also features a coffee shop, miniature golf course, several small general/convenience stores, and a large number of gift shops. No liquor is sold on the island outside of bars or restaurants, but several shops do sell beer and wine.

The island is also home to The Kelley's Island Wine Company, established in 1872 and at one time one of the nation's largest wineries. It stopped operation after two major fires eventually destroyed its facility during the Prohibition era. The 'ruins' of portions of the late-19th-century winery are still standing on the island. In 1982 the Zettler family re-established The Kelley's Island Wine at the site of one of the oldest stone cottages on the island, known as the Nicholas Smith house (built c. 1865). Kirt and Robby Zettler continue to operate it as a working winery and tourist attraction.

Camps

Kelleys Island State Park contains a large campground.

Camp Patmos, a Christian youth camp, is located on the northeast side of the island. Camp Patmos was purchased in 1952 from Nativity B.V.M. Parish of Cleveland as the site of a faith-based summer camp for youth. A chapel was built in 1959 and a pool was added in 1968. Twenty new cabins were also built for campers. Camp Patmos has added many more buildings and programs since then, including a rec center, a  dock, pophouse, and guest cabins. It continues to run Christian summer camp and retreat programs for youth from 4th thru 12th grade.

The Erie County 4H Camp is located on the north side of the island.

Transportation

Ferries
The first ferry to regularly serve the island was the Neuman Ferry, founded in 1907 by John Paul Neuman. The boat originally provided transport from Lakeside, Ohio to what is now the island's East Harbor State Park. At its peak, the company operated a fleet of four ferries: the Commuter, the Corsair, the Kelleys Islander, usually running out of Marblehead; and the Challenger running out of Sandusky. The company folded in the first decade of the 21st century due to financial mismanagement, excessive growth with low market share, and steep price competition by the recently established Kelleys Island Ferry.

The Kelleys Island Ferry is the only line that runs year-round (weather permitting) between the island and the mainland. The line is owned by James "Jim" Palladino and his family. Palladino was tied by local media to the Cleveland Mafia. He was arrested in 1992 for being a felon in possession of over 60 firearms (it is illegal for an individual in Ohio to own any guns if previously convicted of a felony). After the Neuman Ferry line closed, Palladino had purchased several boats from the company, as well their dock on the island. The private ferry runs to Marblehead, Ohio every half-hour during the tourist season, with the ride lasting approximately 25 minutes.

A competing ferry line named the Jet Express runs during the season many times daily from Sandusky to Kelleys Island. The boat line started in 1988; it operates from May through October. It is a passenger-only ferry, and does not carry vehicles. The Jet Express runs from Sandusky, Ohio and makes stops at Cedar Point, Kelleys Island, and Put-In-Bay. The Jet Express boat takes approximately 20 minutes for the trip from Sandusky.

Airport
The east side contains a small public airport, called the Kelleys Island Land Field Airport (FAA LID: 89D). It features a terminal building, a single runway, and a parking area for planes.

Airline and destination

Highways

Kelleys Island is served by Ohio State Route 575. The route was created in 1937 and has not changed since, and is one of Ohio's only state highways to be disconnected from the rest of the system.

Other
Due to the island's small size, many people use bicycles, golf carts and motor scooters as their regular transportation while there. Automobiles can be transported to the island via ferry; though most roads are modern, some streets on the north side as well as near the quarries are unpaved.

Geography

Kelleys Island is located at  (41.601343, -82.697442).

Geology
Kelleys Island consists of Middle Devonian (Eifelian Stage) limestones and dolomites, the Lucas Dolostone, and the Columbus Limestone. The Lucas Dolostone is intensely dolomitized. With the exception of localized algal mounds and stromatoporoids, it is sparsely fossiliferous. Several species of stromatoporoids, which represent four genera, have been recorded from the Lucas Dolostone of Kelleys Island. The Lucas Dolostone accumulated within coastal subtidal to peritidal mudflats. These mudflats were permanently submerged and progressively buried beneath muddy shoal and lagoonal sediments as relative sea level rose and the shoreline shifted westward during the Eifelian Stage.

Overlying the Lucas Dolostone, is the Columbus Limestone, which consists of the lowermost Bellepoint Member, middle Marblehead Member, and uppermost Venice Member. The Bellepoint Member consists of wackestones and packstones, which accumulated as muddy shoals and contain a large number of rugose corals, gastropods, rostroconchs, and brachiopods. The Marblehead Member consists of a lower, thick-bedded, cherty, dolomitic, heavily-burrowed mudstone deposited in lagoonal conditions below mean wave base. These mudstones grade upward into thinner bedded, sparsely fossiliferous packstones and grainstones of this member's upper part that accumulated as subtidal shoals. A rippled, hardground surface forms the top of the Marblehead Member This hardground represents either a period of subaerial erosion or the lack of sediment accumulation at a shallow depth for a significant interval of time. The Marblehead Member is overlain by mudstones and wackestones of the uppermost Venice Member of the Columbus Limestone. This member accumulated below wave base in the open sea after relative sea level rose again.

The Devonian limestone and dolomite that comprise Kelleys Island has been deeply eroded and scoured by the Laurentide Ice Sheet over the Pleistocene. On the island, the largest exposure of glacial grooves and striations created by glacial erosion is preserved in Glacial Grooves State Memorial, which is associated with Kelleys Island State Park. Near the near the east edge of the outcrop, a number of the grooves are relatively straight, smooth, and exhibit striated surfaces. Farther west, the path of the individual grooves becomes far more tortuous, and striations are less distinct and fewer in number.

Munro-Stasiuk and others argue that the giant glacial grooves and the depression, in which they lie, were eroded by highly turbulent, high velocity, sediment-laden meltwater flows. Judging from similar tortuous, giant, glacial grooves, which are found all over, and between, the Lake Erie islands on high and low areas, the erosional features are interpreted to have formed during a subglacial meltwater megaflood that took place before or near the Last Glacial Maximum.

Demographics

2010 census
As of the census of 2010, there were 312 people, 175 households, and 99 families residing in the village. The racial makeup of the village was 98.1% White, 0.3% African American, 0.6% Asian, 0.6% from other races, and 0.3% from two or more races. Hispanic or Latino of any race were 1.3% of the population.

There were 175 households, of which 10.9% had children under the age of 18 living with them, 52.6% were married couples living together, 1.7% had a female householder with no husband present, 2.3% had a male householder with no wife present, and 43.4% were non-families. 41.1% of all households were made up of individuals, and 19.4% had someone living alone who was 65 years of age or older. The average household size was 1.78 and the average family size was 2.34.

The median age in the village was 58.8 years. 9.6% of residents were under the age of 18; 1.3% were between the ages of 18 and 24; 11.2% were from 25 to 44; 43.6% were from 45 to 64; and 34.3% were 65 years of age or older. The gender makeup of the village was 52.6% male and 47.4% female.

2000 census

As of the census of 2000, there were 367 people, 183 households, and 112 families residing in the village. The population density was 80.5 people per square mile (31.1/km2). There were 709 housing units at an average density of 155.5 per square mile (60.0/km2). The racial makeup of the village was 99.46% White, 0.27% African American, 0.27% from other races. Hispanic or Latino of any race were 0.27% of the population.

There were 183 households, out of which 15.8% had children under the age of 18 living with them, 53.6% were married couples living together, 5.5% had a female householder with no husband present, and 38.3% were non-families. 35.5% of all households were made up of individuals, and 15.3% had someone living alone who was 65 years of age or older. The average household size was 1.99 and the average family size was 2.55.

In the village, the population was spread out, with 15.0% under the age of 18, 2.2% from 18 to 24, 19.9% from 25 to 44, 40.1% from 45 to 64, and 22.9% who were 65 years of age or older. The median age was 52 years. For every 100 females, there were 100.5 males. For every 100 females age 18 and over, there were 102.6 males.

The median income for a household in the village was $35,500, and the median income for a family was $49,375. Males had a median income of $29,643 versus $26,071 for females. The per capita income for the village was $21,944. About 7.6% of families and 9.8% of the population were below the poverty line, including none of those under age 18 and 14.0% of those age 65 or over.

Education

Kelleys Island School serves the island and is located on Division Street. The village has a public library, a branch of the Sandusky Library system.

See also
 Populated islands of the Great Lakes

Notes

References

External links

 Kelleys Island Chamber of Commerce
 Kelleys Island Historical Society
 Kelleys Island at TripAdvisor
 Kelleys Island Land Field Airport at AirNav

Villages in Erie County, Ohio
Populated places established in 1826
National Register of Historic Places in Erie County, Ohio
Villages in Ohio
Islands of Lake Erie in Ohio
Ohio populated places on Lake Erie
Landforms of Erie County, Ohio
1826 establishments in Ohio
Tourist attractions in Sandusky, Ohio
Kelleys Island, Ohio